Abderrahmane Daidj (born 19 October 1975) is an Algerian fencer. He competed in the individual épée event at the 2004 Summer Olympics.

References

External links
 

1975 births
Living people
Algerian male épée fencers
Olympic fencers of Algeria
Fencers at the 2004 Summer Olympics
21st-century Algerian people